Ginger Gold is a yellow apple variety which entered commerce in the 1980s, though the original seedling dates from the late 1960s. According to the US Apple Association website, it was one of the fifteen most popular apple cultivars in the United States.

Characteristics
Ginger Gold is one of the earliest commercial apple varieties to ripen, bearing in August on the east coast (mid-July in North Carolina) and July in California. The fruit is large, conical and starts out a very pale green, though if left on the tree will ripen to a soft yellow with a slightly waxy appearance.

The primary use is for eating out of hand, though it can be used for most other purposes. The flesh, of a cream color, resists browning more than most varieties. The flavor is mild but with a tart finish.

In a 1995 evaluation, the Virginia Extension Service held that "This is the best apple that we have evaluated that ripens before 'Gala'."

The trees are very susceptible to mildew.

History
Ginger Gold is famous as the apple that Hurricane Camille brought forth. Camille brought devastating floods to Nelson County, Virginia in 1969, and the orchards of Clyde and Frances "Ginger" Harvey were badly washed out. In recovering the few surviving trees around the edge of one Winesap orchard, another tree was found which Clyde Harvey recognized as being different. It was planted with the rest, but was found to produce yellow rather than red fruit. An extension agent identified the parents as Golden Delicious, Albemarle Pippin, and some other unknown variety. The variety was eventually named after Clyde Harvey's wife.

During the 21st century, this has become an increasingly popular variety. It is the first yellow apple to ripen in the fall, and the quality and consistency of its bearing have suited it to commercial growing.

In January 2007, the Virginia General Assembly proposed a bill designating the Ginger Gold Apple as the official fruit of Virginia.  The bill was tabled in committee in late January.

References

Apple cultivars
Virginia culture
American apples